The 2022–23 Northern Iowa Panthers men's basketball team represented the University of Northern Iowa during the 2022–23 NCAA Division I men's basketball season. The Panthers, led by 17th-year head coach Ben Jacobson, played their home games at the McLeod Center in Cedar Falls, Iowa as members of the Missouri Valley Conference.

Previous season
With a win over Loyola on February 26, 2022, the Panthers won the regular season MVC championship. They finished the regular season 18–10, 14–4 in MVC play to finish in first place. They defeated  Illinois State in the quarterfinals of the MVC tournament before losing in the semifinals to Loyola. As a No. 1 seed who didn't win their conference tournament, they received an automatic bid to the National Invitation Tournament where they defeated Saint Louis in the first round before losing in the second round to BYU.

Offseason

Departures

2021 recruiting class

Roster

Schedule and results

|-
!colspan=9 style=| Exhibition

|-
!colspan=9 style=| Regular Season

|-
!colspan=12 style=| MVC Tournament

Source

References

Northern Iowa Panthers men's basketball seasons
Northern Iowa
Panth
Panth